Amedeo Ambron (born January 23, 1939) is an Italian water polo player who competed in the 1960 Summer Olympics. He was born in Benevento.

Biography
In 1960 he was a member of the Italian water polo team which won the gold medal. He played one match and scored one goal.

See also
 Italy men's Olympic water polo team records and statistics
 List of Olympic champions in men's water polo
 List of Olympic medalists in water polo (men)

External links

 
 

1939 births
Living people
Sportspeople from Benevento
Italian male water polo players
Olympic gold medalists for Italy in water polo
Water polo players at the 1960 Summer Olympics
Medalists at the 1960 Summer Olympics